2000 in sports describes the year's events in world sport.

Alpine skiing
 Alpine Skiing World Cup
 Men's overall season champion: Hermann Maier, Austria
 Women's overall season champion: Renate Götschl, Austria

American football
 Super Bowl XXXIV – the St. Louis Rams (NFC) won 23–16 over the Tennessee Titans (AFC)
Location: Georgia Dome
Attendance: 72,625
MVP: Kurt Warner, QB (St. Louis)
 Marshall Faulk wins the regular-season MVP award.
 Sugar Bowl (1999 season):
 The Florida State Seminoles won 49-29 over the Virginia Tech Hokies to win the college football national championship

Association football
 Euro 2000 – France won 2-1 in extra time over Italy, with a golden goal by Trézéguet. This was France's second European Championship title.
 Champions' League – Real Madrid won 3-0 in the final against Valencia. This was Real Madrid's 8th European Cup title.
 UEFA Cup 1999–2000 – Galatasaray won 4-1 on penalties, in the final against Arsenal, after a 0-0 draw at the end of the match. This was the first European title won by a Turkish team.
 European Super Cup – Galatasaray beat Real Madrid 2-1 after extra time, with a golden goal by Jardel.
 Intercontinental Cup – Boca Juniors beat Real Madrid 2-1, winning the cup for the second time.
FIFA Club World Cup – Sport Club Corinthians Paulista won 4-3 on penalties, in the final against Clube de Regatas Vasco da Gama after a 0-0 draw at the end of the match. This was the inaugural FIFA Club World Cup.

Athletics
 September – Athletics at the 2000 Summer Olympics held at Sydney, Australia

Australian rules football
 Australian Football League
 March 9 – Docklands Stadium opens with Essendon 24.12 (156) beating Port Adelaide 8.14 (62)
 July 15 – Essendon becomes the first club to win its first nineteen games when it beats Hawthorn 25.15 (165) to 13.4 (82). This beats Collingwood's perfect home-and-away season of eighteen games from 1929.
 August 5 – Essendon become the first AFL team to win 21 of 22 games in a VFL/AFL home-and-away season, losing only to the Western Bulldogs in its second last game
 Essendon wins the 104th AFL premiership defeating Melbourne 19.21 (135) to 11.9 (75).
 Brownlow Medal awarded to Shane Woewodin (Melbourne)

Baseball

 Major League Baseball dissolves the National and American Leagues as separate legal entities, although retaining them as competitive entities. From this point forward, the leagues’ functions are consolidated in the office of the Commissioner of Baseball.
 World Series – New York Yankees win 4 games to 1 over the New York Mets. The Series MVP is Derek Jeter of the Yankees
 Japan Series – The Yomiuri Giants defeat the Fukuoka Daiei Hawks 4 games to 2. The Giants' Hideki Matsui is named Series MVP.

Basketball
 NBA Finals –
 Los Angeles Lakers win their first NBA title in twelve years, defeating the Indiana Pacers 4 games to 2.
 NCAA Men's Basketball Championship –
 Michigan State wins 89–76 over Florida
 WNBA Finals –
 Houston Comets win 2 games to 0 over the New York Liberty to complete their four–peat.
 Euroleague final:
 Panathinaikos defeats Maccabi Tel Aviv 73–67 for the title.
 National Basketball League (Australia) Finals:
 Perth Wildcats defeated the Victoria Titans 2–0 in the best–of–three final series.
 European basketball enters a new era with the creation of the Euroleague Basketball (company). This leads to a rift with FIBA Europe and the creation of two separate continent-wide competitions for the 2000–01 season—the SuproLeague, operated by FIBA Europe, and Euroleague Basketball's Euroleague.

Boxing
 May 13 to May 21 – 2000 European Amateur Boxing Championships held in Tampere, Finland
 July 29 – Kostya Tszyu defeats Julio César Chávez by a knockout in six to retain the WBC's world Jr. Welterweight title.
 August 12 – Evander Holyfield defeats John Ruiz by decision in 12 rounds to regain the WBA's world Heavyweight title, becoming the first boxer to win the world Heavyweight title four times.
 The Ring named Félix Trinidad the "Fighter of the Year 2000". Eric Morales won a 12-round points victory over Marco Antonio Barrera, for the unified WBC and WBO 122 Pound Titles, in The Ring's "Fight of The Year 2000".

Canadian football
 Grey Cup – B.C. Lions win 28–26 over the Montreal Alouettes
 Vanier Cup – Ottawa Gee-Gees win 42–39 over the Regina Rams

Cricket
 June 26 – Bangladesh becomes the tenth Test cricket playing nation.

Cycle racing
Road bicycle racing
 Giro d'Italia – Stefano Garzelli
 Tour de France – Lance Armstrong (Rescinded)
 World Road Cycling Championship – Romans Vainšteins
Cyclo-cross
 2000 UCI Cyclo-cross World Championships
 Men's Competition won by Richard Groenendaal
 Women's Competition won by Hanka Kupfernagel

Dogsled racing
 Iditarod Trail Sled Dog Race Champion
 Doug Swingley wins with lead dogs: Stormy & Cola

Field hockey
 Olympic Games Men's Competition: Netherlands
 Olympic Games Women's Competition: Australia

Figure skating
 World Figure Skating Championships –
 Men's champion: Alexei Yagudin, Russia
 Ladies' champion: Michelle Kwan, United States
 Pairs' champions: Maria Petrova and Alexei Tikhonov, Russia
 Ice dance champions: Marina Anissina and Gwendal Peizerat, France
 First World Synchronized Skating Championships held in Minneapolis

Floorball 
 Men's World Floorball Championships
 Champion: Sweden

Gaelic Athletic Association
Camogie
 All–Ireland Camogie Champion: Tipperary
 National Camogie League: Cork
Gaelic football
 All-Ireland Senior Football Championship – Kerry 0–17 beats Galway 1–10
 National Football League – Derry 1–8 beats Meath 0–9
 Sligo Senior Football Championship – Bunninadden were crowned County Champions by defeating Coolera/Strandhill
 Dublin Senior Football Championship – Na Fianna were crowned County Champions by defeating Kilmacud Crokes
Ladies' Gaelic football
 All-Ireland Senior Football Champion: Mayo
 National Football League: Mayo
Hurling
 All-Ireland Senior Hurling Championship – Kilkenny 5–15 died Offaly 1–14
 National Hurling League – Galway 2–18 beat Tipperary 2–13

Golf
Men's professional
 Masters Tournament – Vijay Singh
 U.S. Open – Tiger Woods wins by 15 shots, a record for all majors, with a U.S. Open to–par record score of –12.
 British Open – Tiger Woods becomes the fifth golfer in history to achieve the modern "career grand slam", and sets the to–par record for all majors (–19).
 PGA Championship – Tiger Woods becomes the first golfer since Ben Hogan in 1953 to win three majors in a calendar year. He ties the to–par record for the PGA (–18) with Bob May, and wins in a playoff.
 PGA Tour money leader – Tiger Woods – $9,188,321
 PGA Tour Player of the Year – Tiger Woods
 PGA Tour Rookie of the Year – Michael Clark II
 Tiger Woods set or tied a total of 27 PGA Tour records during the year
 Senior PGA Tour money leader – Larry Nelson – $2,708,005
Men's amateur
 British Amateur – Mikko Ilonen
 U.S. Amateur – Jeff Quinney
 European Amateur – Carl Pettersson
Women's professional
 Nabisco Championship – Karrie Webb
 LPGA Championship – Juli Inkster
 U.S. Women's Open – Karrie Webb
 Classique du Maurier – Meg Mallon
 LPGA Tour money leader – Karrie Webb – $1,876,853
 The European team defeated the United States team 14 ½ – 11 ½ to regain the Solheim Cup.

Handball
 Men's European Championship: Sweden
 Women's European Championship: Hungary

Harness racing
 March 18 – John Campbell became the first driver in harness racing history to reach $100 million in earnings at one track on at the Meadowlands Racetrack.
 North America Cup – Gallo Blue Chip
 United States Pacing Triple Crown races –
 Cane Pace – Powerful Toy
 Little Brown Jug – Astreos
 Messenger Stakes – Ain't No Stopn Him
 United States Trotting Triple Crown races –
 Hambletonian – Yankee Paco
 Yonkers Trot – Goalfish
 Kentucky Futurity – Credit Winner
 Australian Inter Dominion Harness Racing Championship –
 Pacers: Shakamaker
 Trotters: Lyell Creek

Horse racing
Steeplechases
 Cheltenham Gold Cup – Looks Like Trouble
 Grand National – Papillon
Flat races
 Australia – Melbourne Cup won by Brew
 Canada – Queen's Plate won by Scatter the Gold
 Dubai – Dubai World Cup won by Dubai Millennium	
 France – Prix de l'Arc de Triomphe won by Sinndar
 Ireland – Irish Derby Stakes won by Sinndar
 Japan – Japan Cup won by T M Opera O
 English Triple Crown Races:
 2,000 Guineas Stakes – King's Best
 The Derby – Sinndar
 St. Leger Stakes – Millenary
 United States Triple Crown Races:
 Kentucky Derby – Fusaichi Pegasus
 Preakness Stakes – Red Bullet
 Belmont Stakes – Commendable
 Breeders' Cup World Thoroughbred Championships:
 Breeders' Cup Classic – Tiznow
 Breeders' Cup Distaff – Spain
 Breeders' Cup Filly & Mare Turf – Perfect Sting
 Breeders' Cup Juvenile – Macho Uno
 Breeders' Cup Juvenile Fillies – Caressing
 Breeders' Cup Mile – War Chant
 Breeders' Cup Sprint – Kona Gold
 Breeders' Cup Turf – Kalanisi

Ice hockey
 Art Ross Trophy as the NHL's leading scorer during the regular season: Jaromir Jagr, Pittsburgh Penguins
 Hart Memorial Trophy for the NHL's Most Valuable Player:
 Chris Pronger, St. Louis Blues
 Stanley Cup –New Jersey Devils win 4 games to 2 over the Dallas Stars
 World Hockey Championship
 Men's champion: Czech Republic defeated Slovakia
 Junior Men's champion: Czech Republic defeated Russia
 Women's champion:  Canada defeated the United States

Lacrosse
 Toronto Rock defeats Rochester Knighthawks 14-13 to win the National Lacrosse League championship

Mixed martial arts
The following is a list of major noteworthy MMA events during 2000 in chronological order.

|-
|align=center style="border-style: none none solid solid; background: #e3e3e3"|Date
|align=center style="border-style: none none solid solid; background: #e3e3e3"|Event
|align=center style="border-style: none none solid solid; background: #e3e3e3"|Alternate Name/s
|align=center style="border-style: none none solid solid; background: #e3e3e3"|Location
|align=center style="border-style: none none solid solid; background: #e3e3e3"|Attendance
|align=center style="border-style: none none solid solid; background: #e3e3e3"|PPV Buyrate
|align=center style="border-style: none none solid solid; background: #e3e3e3"|Notes
|-align=center
|January 30
|Pride Grand Prix 2000 Opening Round
|
| Tokyo, Japan
|48,316
|
|
|-align=center
|March 10
|UFC 24: First Defense
|
| Lake Charles, Louisiana, United States
|
|
|
|-align=center
|April 14
|UFC 25: Ultimate Japan 3
|
| Tokyo, Japan
|
|
|
|-align=center
|May 1
|Pride Grand Prix 2000 Finals
|
| Tokyo, Japan
|38,429
|
|
|-align=center
|June 4
|Pride 9: New Blood
|
| Nagoya, Japan
|
|
|
|-align=center
|June 9
|UFC 26: Ultimate Field Of Dreams
|
| Cedar Rapids, Iowa, United States
|
|
|
|-align=center
|August 27
|Pride 10 – Return of the Warriors
|
| Tokorozawa, Saitama, Japan
|35,000
|
|
|-align=center
|September 22
|UFC 27: Ultimate Bad Boyz
|
| New Orleans, United States
|
|
|
|-align=center
|October 31
|Pride 11 – Battle of the Rising Sun
|
| Osaka, Japan
|13,500
|
|
|-align=center
|November 17
|UFC 28: High Stakes
|
| Atlantic City, New Jersey, United States
|
|
|
|-align=center
|December 9
|Pride 12 – Cold Fury
|
| Saitama, Japan
|26,882
|
|
|-align=center
|December 16
|UFC 29: Defense of the Belts
|
| Tokyo, Japan
|1,414
|
|
|-align=center

Motorsport

Radiosport
 The third World Radiosport Team Championship held in Ljubljana, Slovenia. Gold medals won by Jeff Steinman N5TJ and Dan Street K1TO of the United States.
 Tenth Amateur Radio Direction Finding World Championships are held in Nanjing, China, the first time ever to be hosted at a location outside Europe.

Rugby league
 January 22, Wigan, England – 2000 World Club Challenge is won by the Melbourne Storm who defeat St. Helens 44 – 6 at JJB Stadium before 13,394.
 April 21, Sydney, Australia – 2000 ANZAC test match is won by Australia 52–0 against New Zealand at Stadium Australia before 26,023.
 April 29, Murrayfield Stadium – 2000 Challenge Cup tournament culminates in the Bradford Bulls' 24 – 18 win in the final against the Leeds Rhinos.
 June 5, Suncorp Stadium – 2000 State of Origin series is wrapped up by New South Wales in game two of the series against Queensland.
 August 27, Stadium Australia – 2000 NRL season culminates in the Brisbane Broncos' 14-6 win in the grand final against the Sydney Roosters.
 October 14, Old Trafford – Super League V culminates in St. Helens' 29-16 win in the grand final against Wigan Warriors.
 November 20, Crown Flatt – 2000 Emerging Nations Tournament is won by the British Amateur Rugby League Association who defeated Italy 20-14 in the final.
 November 25, Old Trafford – 2000 World Cup tournament culminates in Australia's 40-12 win in the final against New Zealand.

Rugby union
 Italy is admitted to the former Five Nations Championship which now establishes its current Six Nations format
 106th Six Nations Championship series is won by England
 Tri Nations – Australia

Snooker
 World Snooker Championship – Mark Williams beats Matthew Stevens 18–16
 World rankings – Mark Williams becomes world number one for 2000/01

Swimming
 Fifth World Short Course Championships, held in Athens, Greece (March 16 – March 19)
 United States wins the most medals (25), and the most gold medals (9)
 25th European LC Championships, held in Helsinki, Finland (July 3 – August 9)
 Romania wins the most medals (14), Sweden and Russia the most gold medals (6)
 XXVII Olympic Games, held in Sydney, Australia (September 16 – September 23)
 Fourth European SC Championships, held in Valencia, Spain (December 14 – December 17)
 Great Britain wins the most medals (19), Sweden the most gold medals (10)
 January 18 – Australia's Susie O'Neill breaks her own world record in the 200 m butterfly (short course) again, this time at a meet in Sydney, Australia, clocking 2:04.16.
 February 12 – In Paris, France, US–swimmer Jenny Thompson betters her own world record in the women's 100 m butterfly (short course), from 56:90 to 56:80.
 March 18 – Jenny Thompson again betters her own world record in the women's 100 m butterfly (short course), this time in Athens, Greece, from 56:80 to 56:56.
 March 23 – Anthony Ervin breaks the world record in the men's 50 m freestyle (short course) at a swimming meet in Minneapolis, clocking 21.21.
 June 16 – At the Russian National Swimming Championships in Moscow, Alexander Popov betters the ten-year-old world record (21.81) in the 50m freestyle (long course), swam by USA's Tom Jager in 1990 – 21.64.

Tennis
 Grand Slam in tennis men's results:
 Australian Open – Andre Agassi
 French Open – Gustavo Kuerten
 Wimbledon championships – Pete Sampras
 U.S. Open – Marat Safin
 Grand Slam in tennis women's results:
 Australian Open – Lindsay Davenport
 French Open – Mary Pierce
 Wimbledon championships – Venus Williams
 U.S. Open – Venus Williams
 2000 Summer Olympics
Men's Singles Competition – Yevgeny Kafelnikov
Women's Singles Competition – Venus Williams
Men's Doubles Competition – Sébastien Lareau & Daniel Nestor
Women's Doubles Competition – Venus Williams & Serena Williams
 Davis Cup
 Spain wins 3–1 over Australia in world tennis

Volleyball
 Men's World League: Italy
 Women's World Grand Prix: Cuba
 Olympic Games Men's Competition – Yugoslavia
 Olympic Games Women's Competition – Cuba

Water polo
 Olympic Games men's competition: Hungary
 Olympic Games women's competition: Australia

Yacht racing
 New Zealand retains the America's Cup as Team New Zealand defeats Italian challenger, Luna Rossa, 5 races to 0

Multi-sport events
 2000 Summer Olympics held at Sydney
 United States wins the most medals (97) and the most gold medals (40).
 Winter Goodwill Games held at Lake Placid, New York

Awards
 Associated Press Male Athlete of the Year – Tiger Woods, PGA Tour golfer
 Associated Press Female Athlete of the Year – Marion Jones, Track and Field
 ABC's Wide World of Sports Athlete of the Year: Tiger Woods, PGA Tour golfer.  Note that the Wide World award was discontinued in 2001.

References

 
Sports by year